Beck's least gecko (Sphaerodactylus becki) is a species of lizard in the family Sphaerodactylidae. The species is endemic to Navassa Island.

Etymology
The specific name, becki, is in honor of American ornithologist Rollo Howard Beck.

Habitat
The preferred habitat of S. becki is dry forest.

Behavior
S. becki hides in leaf litter and under rocks.

Reproduction
S. becki is oviparous.

References

Further reading
Powell R, Ottenwalder JA, Inchaustegui SJ (1999). "The Hispaniolan Herpetofauna: Diversity, Endemism, and Historical Perspectives, with Comments on Navassa Island". pp. 93–168 In: Crother BI, editor (1999). Caribbean Amphibians and Reptiles. San Diego California: Academic Press. 495 pp. + color plates 1-8. . (Sphaerodactylus becki, pp. 138, 140, 161).
Rösler H (2000). "Kommentierte Liste der rezent, subrezent und fossil bekannten Geckotaxa (Reptilia: Gekkonomorpha) ". Gekkota 2: 28-153. (Sphaerodactylus becki, p. 110). (in German).
Schmidt KP (1919). "Descriptions of New Amphibians and Reptiles from Santo Domingo and Navassa". Bulletin of the American Museum of Natural History 41: 519-525. (Sphaerodactylus becki, new species, p. 520).
Schwartz A, Henderson RW (1991). Amphibians and Reptiles of the West Indies: Descriptions, Distributions, and Natural History. Gainesville, Florida: University of Florida Press. 720 pp. . (Sphaerodactylus becki, p. 472).
Schwartz A, Thomas R (1975). A Check-list of West Indian Amphibians and Reptiles. Carnegie Museum of Natural History Special Publication No. 1. Pittsburgh, Pennsylvania: Carnegie Museum of Natural History. 216 pp. (Sphaerodactylus becki, p. 145).

Sphaerodactylus
Lizards of the Caribbean
Reptiles described in 1919
Taxa named by Karl Patterson Schmidt